Mesodina cyanophracta, the blue iris-skipper, is a butterfly of the family Hesperiidae. It is endemic to the north-west and south-west coast of the state of Western Australia.

The wingspan is about 30 mm.

The larvae feed on Patersonia juncacea, Patersonia lanata, Patersonia umbrosa var. xanthina and Patersonia occidentalis. They construct a shelter formed like a vertical tube and made by joining the leaves of its host plant. It rests in this shelter during the day. Pupation takes place inside the shelter.

External links
Australian Insects
Australian Faunal Directory

Trapezitinae
Butterflies described in 1911